Danek Nowosielski (born 16 November 1966) is a Canadian fencer. He competed at the 1988, 1992 and 1996 Summer Olympics. He was inducted into the Lisgar Collegiate Institute Athletic Wall of Fame in 2009.

See also
List of Princeton University Olympians

References

External links
 

1966 births
Living people
Canadian male fencers
Olympic fencers of Canada
Fencers at the 1988 Summer Olympics
Fencers at the 1992 Summer Olympics
Fencers at the 1996 Summer Olympics
Fencers from Montreal
Canadian people of Polish descent
Pan American Games medalists in fencing
Pan American Games silver medalists for Canada
Pan American Games bronze medalists for Canada
Lisgar Collegiate Institute alumni
Fencers at the 1987 Pan American Games
Fencers at the 1991 Pan American Games